Zilla and Zoe is a 2019 American comedy film written, produced, and directed by Jessica Scalise. The movie had a limited theatrical release in the United States on May 17, 2019.

Plot
Zoe, a 10-year-old girl, is obsessed with horror movies and is trying to shoot her own film to enter a contest. When her father forbids her from doing horror movies and forces her to shoot her sister's wedding ceremony, Zoe decides to turn the ceremony itself into a horror movie in order to win the contest.

Cast
 Greg James as Sal
 Aida Valentine as Zoe
 Sam Kamerman as Zilla
 Kurt Conroyd as Oscar
 Mia Allen as Lu

Release

Reception
Kimber Myers from the Los Angeles Times wrote: "'Zilla and Zoe' eventually gets to a message of love and acceptance, but you have to slog through some real cruelty from the girls’ father to get to that point....There’s something special here, but it’s surrounded by drudgery."

References

External links
 
 

2019 films
American comedy films
2019 comedy films
2010s English-language films
2010s American films